Trendione (developmental code name RU-2065; nickname Trenavar), also known as estra-4,9,11-triene-3,17-dione, is an androgen prohormone as well as metabolite of the anabolic steroid trenbolone. Trendione is to trenbolone as androstenedione is to testosterone. The compound is inactive itself, showing more than 100-fold lower affinity for the androgen and progesterone receptors than trenbolone. It is a designer steroid and has been sold on the internet as a "nutritional supplement". Trendione is listed in the United States Designer Anabolic Steroid Control Act of 2014.

See also
 List of androgens/anabolic steroids

References

Abandoned drugs
Androgens and anabolic steroids
Designer drugs
Diketones
Estranes
Human drug metabolites
Prodrugs
Progestogens